Penrose is an unincorporated farming community in eastern Box Elder County, Utah, United States.

Description

The community was named for Charles W. Penrose, an apostle for the Church of Jesus Christ of Latter-day Saints.

The first permanent settler to the Penrose area was C.S. Rowher, in 1890. He, along with others, farmed beets, wheat, corn and hay.

See also

References

External links

Unincorporated communities in Box Elder County, Utah
Unincorporated communities in Utah
Populated places established in 1890